Petra Manam is a 1960 Indian Tamil-language film directed by A. Bhimsingh and produced by National Pictures. The film stars Sivaji Ganesan, Pushpavalli, S. S. Rajendran and Padmini. It is the Tamil version of the 1953 Telugu film Pempudu Koduku.

Plot

Cast 
 Sivaji Ganesan
 Pushpavalli
 S. S. Rajendran
 M. N. Rajam
S. V. Subbaiah
 L. Vijayalakshmi
 J. P. Chandrababu
 Padmini Priyadarshini

Production 
Petra Manam was produced by National Pictures, written by Mu. Varadarajan, and shot by G. Vittal Rao. It had choreography by K. N. Dhandayudha Pani, Pillai Thangappan and Muthusami Pillai. According to M. L. Narasimhan of The Hindu, it was simultaneously filmed in Telugu as Pempudu Koduku, despite the fact that there is a seven-year release gap between these two films; the latter was released in 1953.

Soundtrack 
The music was composed by S. Rajeswara Rao and the lyrics were penned by Ku. Mu. Annalthango, M. K. Athmanathan, Bharathidasan, Kannadasan and K. P. Kamatchisundaram. The song "Sinthanai Seiyadaa" has somewhat similar tune of "Adha Hai Chandrama Raat Adhi" from Navrang (1959).

Release 
Petra Manam was released on 19 October 1960. Facing competition from Kairasi, Paavai Vilakku, and Mannathi Mannan, released on the same day, it fared averagely at box office.

References

External links 
 

1960 drama films
1960s Tamil-language films
Films directed by A. Bhimsingh
Films scored by S. Rajeswara Rao
Indian drama films
Tamil remakes of Telugu films